The 2011–12 Middle Tennessee Blue Raiders men's basketball team represented Middle Tennessee State University during the 2011–12 NCAA Division I men's basketball season. The Blue Raiders, led by tenth year head coach Kermit Davis, played their home games at the Murphy Center and are members of the East Division of the Sun Belt Conference. They finished the season 27–7, 14–2 in Sun Belt play to be Sun Belt East Division champions and overall regular season conference champions. They lost in the quarterfinals of the Sun Belt Basketball tournament to Arkansas State. As regular season conference champions, they received an automatic bid into the 2012 National Invitation Tournament where they defeated Marshall in the first round and Tennessee in the second round before falling in the quarterfinals to Minnesota.

Roster

Schedule

|-
!colspan=9| Exhibition

|-
!colspan=9| Regular season

|-
!colspan=9| 2012 Sun Belt Conference men's basketball tournament

|-
!colspan=9| 2012 NIT

References

Middle Tennessee Blue Raiders men's basketball seasons
Middle Tennessee
Middle Tennessee
Middle Tennessee Blue Raiders
Middle Tennessee Blue Raiders